Redcar Aerodrome is a former First World War airfield located in Redcar, North Yorkshire, England. The site hosted an elementary flying school for newly entered pilots into the Royal Naval Air Service, though some offensive and defensive operations were flown from Redcar as well. The base was created as part of chain of new air stations after the German naval bombardment of east coast towns in December 1914. The base had a brief operational lifespan between July 1915 and December 1919, after which it was decided not to retain Redcar as an active station, and much of the site has been re-used for housing.

History
The aerodrome was opened in the early part of the First World War, though its first unit did not form until July 1915. Redcar was developed along with many other sites in response to the raid on Scarborough, Hartlepool and Whitby, a German naval bombardment in which over 100 civilians were killed. This task fell to the Royal Naval Air Service as opposed to the Royal Flying Corps, who on the outbreak of the war, were largely sent to the Front. Rather than using the existing grassed area of Redcar Racecourse, the site was immediately to the west and was initially used for flying training only. Redcar was one of four (RNAS) sites used to train pilots on their elementary flying training (the others being Chingford, Eastchurch and Vendome, although Eastbourne and Manston were also used). Records show that Redcar was also used to train existing pilots in instructor duties, so most of those transiting through, would already be familiar to flying. Other Flying Instructors School(s) (FIS), were located at Ayr, Curragh, Gosport, Lilbourne and Shoreham.

However, the station wasn't equipped with an officers' mess, and trainee pilots were hosted in the local village, requiring them to walk to and from the aerodrome four times a day.

On the night of 8/9 August 1916, the aerodrome was attacked by a Zeppelin. No lasting damage or injuries occurred, but the electricity supply to the camp was severed. It was recognised that the aircraft of the RNAS were quite ineffective at night combat against Zeppelins, and an admiralty report stated that aircraft were not reliable enough to be launched from land, and advocated using seaplanes and the closure of aerodromes at Scarborough, Whitley Bay, Hornsea and Redcar in favour of seaplane stations.

Although designated as a training airfield, and used mostly as that, some defensive and offensive operations were launched from Redcar, most notable from 1917 when it became a Temporary Marine Operations (Aeroplane) station. In September 1917, four Handley Page 0/100 aircraft were detached from 7 (Naval) Squadron (later No. 207 Squadron), to engage in Anti-Submarine Warfare (ASW). This task was also undertaken in 1918 by detachments of Bristol Scouts from No. 273 Squadron, which was based at Burgh Castle at the time.
 
In April 1918, the North Eastern Flying Instructors School formed at the base, and in October of the same year, No. 63 Training Squadron arrived from RAF Joyce Green.

In December 1919, an order was released stating that Redcar was not to be used as it was in the process of closing down. The western edge of the base, which hosted the technical site, has been re-used for housing. The base was left alone after 1919 and not broken up until 1923, when explosives were used to dislodge the hardcore. This was then re-used in a local road to Eston.

Crashes
It was estimated that at least 8,000 aircrew died in training accidents during the First World War. Just like many other First World War aerodromes, the attrition rate for pilots at Redcar was high, especially among the training cadre. Over 130 crashes involving aircraft which had RNAS/RAF Redcar as a home base between July 1915 and April 1918 have been recorded. Probationary officer Francis Titcomb crashed his aircraft near Egton on his first solo flight in April 1917. Whilst he survived the crash, he succumbed to his wounds in a nearby farmhouse. A grade II listed cross marks the site of the crash.

On 2 April 1918, Charles Edward Pattison crashed his Sopwith Camel aircraft at Redcar after hitting overhead wires. Pattison died from his injuries becoming one of the first casualties of the newly-formed Royal Air Force.

Based units
Between 1915 and 1919, the following units were based at Redcar:

Notable personnel
Due to the proximity of both aerodromes, and as the postal town for Marske was Redcar, some errors have crept in.

Raymond Collishaw, trained at the base between February and July '1916
Richard Bell Davies, made commanding officer of Redcar in January 1916 (along with Killingholme, Whitley Bay and Scarborough air stations)
Bruno De Roeper, flew defensive patrols from the base
Pruett Mullens Dennett
Thomas Gerrard
Walter G. R. Hinchliffe
Oliver LeBoutillier, student at Redcar in 1917
Edwin Swale, trained at Redcar
Ronald Sykes, trained at Redcar

References

Sources

External links
BBC Sounds interview with pieces about Redcar Aerdrome

Military units and formations established in 1915
Redcar
World War I airfields
World War I sites in England
Redcar
Military history of North Yorkshire